Central Jacob Lines  is a neighborhood in Karachi East district of Karachi, Pakistan. It was previously administered as part of Jamshed Town, which was disbanded In 2011. It is named after General John Jacob.

There are several ethnic groups in Central Jacob Lines including Muhajirs, Punjabis, Sindhis, Kashmiris, Seraikis, Pakhtuns, Balochis, Memons, Bohras, Ismailis, etc.

References

External links 
 Karachi Website.

Neighbourhoods of Karachi
Jamshed Town